Mokama Assembly constituency is one of 243 constituencies of legislative assembly of Bihar. It is a part of Munger Lok Sabha constituency. Mokama is in the 14 assembly segments which fall under Patna district.

Overview
Mokama comprises CD Blocks Ghoswari & Mokama; Gram Panchayats Raili, Lemuabad, West Pandarak, East Pandarak, Kondi, Dhobhawan, Khushhal Chak, Chak Jalal, Ajgara Bakawan, Darwe Bhadaur & Baruane Bathoi of Pandarak CD Block.

Members of Legislative Assembly

^ bypoll

Election results

2022 By election

2020

2015

2010

References

External links
 

Assembly constituencies in Patna district
Politics of Patna district
Assembly constituencies of Bihar